Chen Li-Ling and Li Fang won in the final 6–0, 6–2 against Kerry-Anne Guse and Valda Lake.

Seeds
Champion seeds are indicated in bold text while text in italics indicates the round in which those seeds were eliminated.

 Yayuk Basuki /  Andrea Strnadová (first round)
 Ei Iida /  Maya Kidowaki (first round)
 Sandy Collins /  Mariaan de Swardt (semifinals)
 Kerry-Anne Guse /  Valda Lake (final)

Draw

External links
 1994 Nokia Open Doubles Draw

Doubles
1994 in Chinese tennis